is a passenger railway station located in the town of Kuroshio, Hata District, Kōchi Prefecture, Japan. It is operated by the Tosa Kuroshio Railway and has the station number "TK38".

Lines
Only local trains stop at this station.

Layout
The station consists of a side platform serving a single track situated on an embankment above farmland on both sides. There is no station building, only a shelter for waiting passengers. Parking and a bike shed are provided on a lay-by along 
National Route 56 which runs adjacent to the embankment. A flight of steps leads up from the parking area to the platform and the station is thus not wheelchair accessible.

Adjacent stations

|-
!colspan=5|Tosa Kuroshio Railway

History
The station opened on 1 October 1970 under the management of Japanese National Railways (JNR). After the privatization of JNR, control of the station passed to Tosa Kuroshio Railway on 1 April 1988.

Passenger statistics
In fiscal 2011, the station was used by an average of nine passengers daily.

See also
 List of Railway Stations in Japan

References

External links

Railway stations in Kōchi Prefecture
Railway stations in Japan opened in 1970
Kuroshio, Kōchi